Bicyclohexyl, also known as dicyclohexyl or bicyclohexane, is an organic chemical with the formula C12H22 and a molecular mass of 166.303 g mol−1. Its structure consists of two cyclohexane rings joined by a single carbon-carbon bond.

Production
Carbazole can be denitrogenated by hydrogen to yield bicyclohexyl as the main product.

When cyclohexane is exposed to radiation, bicyclohexyl is produced among other hydrocarbons.

Properties
The molecule is not completely flat, and the two rings are twisted compared to each other. Liquid bicyclohexyl contains a mixture of molecules with C2 and C2h symmetry termed ee anti, and ee gauche. The carbon-carbon bond (pivot) between the rings is 1.55 Å, and the carbon-carbon length in the rings is 1.535 Å and carbon-hydrogen bond length is 1.102 Å. The torsion angle between the rings is 74.9°. The C-C-C bond angle ∠ is about 111° and C-C-H angle is 109°.

The speed of sound in bicyclohexyl is 1441.51 m/s, higher than many other hydrocarbons. The density is 882.73 kgm−1. The isothermal compressibility is 674 TPa−1 and isobaric expansivity is 819 K−1.

When bicyclohexyl is heated to around  it slowly decomposes to cyclohexane and cyclohexene, as the pivot bond joining the two rings is the longest and weakest one.

Heat of combustion is 1814.8 kcal/mol.

Use
Bicyclohexyl has uses in organic synthesis as a building block and structural motif, in studying the chemistry of liquid interfaces, and in surface modification of metal oxides as a solvent.

See also
Biphenyl

References 

Cyclohexyl compounds
Hydrocarbons